Curtis Smith is a second-generation American semi-retired drag racer. He is currently the All Time Winningest IHRA Stock Eliminator driver and the 1996 IHRA Stock World Champion. Smith was the first IHRA Sportsman driver to win 3 national events in a row in 1985.

Smith started his national racing career in the early 1970s, driving his self-built 1969 "Rag Top" Chevrolet Camaro J/Stocker. Smith notably finished second in his first IHRA National Event at Rockingham Dragway. Smith, best known for driving his "Hot Stuff" 1967 Chevy Camaro, has won 17 IHRA and NHRA national events in his career and 31 IHRA and NHRA class wins, making him one of the most successful sportsman Drag racing drivers in the history of the sport.

In 2012, Smith was inducted into the North Carolina Drag Racing Hall of Fame. Two years later, Smith, along with fellow racer, Rick Hendrick was inducted into the East Coast Drag Racing Hall of Fame. Later that year, Smith was also honored with being inducted into the Sampson County Sports Hall of Fame.

Early life
Curtis Smith was born in Clinton, North Carolina. His father, Earl, was a notable drag racer, racing with Chevrolet from 1957 to his retirement in 2003. Smith attended races with his father from a young age, often getting the chance to warm his father's race cars up before the races. The first race car that the young Smith drove down the race track was his father, Earl, and "Junior" Lundy's 1962 Chevrolet Bel Air "Bubble Top" 409 4-Speed NHRA Stocker.

Racing career

1970s–1980s
Following his father's footsteps, Curtis built his own race cars and racing engines from an early age. Like his father, Smith raced the Chevrolet brand. Smith scored second place in his first IHRA National Event, and won his first national event in 1982. Smith quickly hit the ground running and won a national race every year from '82-'87. In 1984, Smith won the prestigious NHRA Summer Nationals held at Old Bridge Township Raceway Park in Englishtown, New Jersey. 
In 1985, Smith made IHRA history, winning the first three national races of the season, becoming the first IHRA Sportsman driver to do so. In 1986 and 1987, Smith won back-to-back IHRA U.S. Open Nationals. In 1990, Curtis would continue his success at Rockingham Dragway, winning his fifth national race at the track since 1982, bringing home the NHRA Winston Invitational win.

1990s
Smith started off the 1990s with fast success, winning two IHRA races and one NHRA race during 1990. In 1990 at Darlington, South Carolina during the IHRA Winter Nationals, Curtis squared off with his father, Earl, in the final round of the event. The All Smith final round would be the first of three different meetings between the Smith father and son during the final round of an IHRA national event. 
From 1990-1995, Smith enjoyed vast amounts of success at Bristol Dragway, winning the IHRA Fall Nationals event four times. In 1996, Smith won the IHRA Winter Nationals for a fourth time, earning him the nickname "Mr. Winter Nationals." That victory at Darlington, and another later in the year at Maryland International Dragway, propelled Smith to the IHRA Stock Eliminator World Championship at the end of 1996. In 1997, Smith won the Snap-On Finals event at Darlington, tallying his total Darlington wins to six, making him one of the most successful drivers in the track's history. Smith is also listed on Rockingham Dragway's all time leaders, with five career wins, tied for third most in the track's history.

Personal life
Smith is a graduate of Clinton High School and is married to wife, Ingrid, and has two children, Curt Jr. and Catherine. Smith is the owner of Curtis Smith Trucking, LLC., a trucking company based out of Clinton, NC. Smith is also the owner of Curtis Smith Racing, who his son Curt Jr. and himself race two cars out of.

Awards and honors
1996 IHRA Stock Eliminator World Champion
 All Time Winningest IHRA Stock Eliminator driver
 Top 10 All Time Winningest IHRA Sportsman driver
 Third All Time Winningest at Rockingham Dragway
 First IHRA Sportsman driver to win 3 national races in a row
 1984 NHRA Summer Nationals Champion
 1990 NHRA Winston Invitational Champion
 1987 & 1988 & 1996 Car Craft All Star
 17 Time IHRA/NHRA National Event Winner
 31 Time IHRA/NHRA Class Winner
 2012 North Carolina Drag Racing Hall of Fame
 2014 East Coast Drag Racing Hall of Fame
 2014 Sampson County Sports Hall of Fame

References

Year of birth missing (living people)
Living people
Dragster drivers
Racing drivers from North Carolina
People from Clinton, North Carolina